Fred Mansfield Brice (December 6, 1887 – January 10, 1967) was an American football, basketball, and baseball coach.

Brice served as the head football coach at the University of Maine from 1921 to 1940, compiling a record of 79–58–9 and winning 10 Maine Intercollegiate Athletic Association championships. He is the "Brice" in the name of the rivalry game with the New Hampshire Wildcats, the Battle for the Brice-Cowell Musket. Brice was also the head basketball coach at Maine from 1925 to 1929, tallying a mark of 14–31, and the school's head baseball coach from 1926 to 1935, amassing a record of 67–60.

Brice died at the age of 79 on January 10, 1967, at his home in Pittsfield, New Hampshire.  He was born in Lawrence, Massachusetts.

Head coaching record

Football

Baseball
Below is a table of Brice's records as a collegiate head baseball coach.

References

1887 births
1967 deaths
Maine Black Bears baseball coaches
Maine Black Bears football coaches
Maine Black Bears men's basketball coaches
Sportspeople from Lawrence, Massachusetts
Baseball coaches from Massachusetts
Coaches of American football from Massachusetts
Basketball coaches from Massachusetts
People from Pittsfield, New Hampshire